The Khalkhal Khanate was an 18th-19th century khanate based in Khalkhal. Khanate of Khalkhal was one of the khanates, located in historic Azerbaijan which remained semi-independent for 62 years.

Founding 
The khanate was formed after assassination of Nader Shah in 1747 and was founded by Qizilbash tribes, especially Amirli clan of Afshars. Founder of the khanate was Amir-Guna Khan (1747-1782), a former governor of Gilan. He formed an alliance with Fath-Ali Khan Afshar against Karim Khan Zand, later betraying him to the latter. After Karim Khan's death he forged alliance with Gilan against Nazarali Khan Shahsevan. He was succeeded by his son Farajulla Khan (1782-1786). His younger son Muhammad Hussein Khan, retained power until the establishment of the Qajar state in the region, when Agha Muhammad Shah Qajar (1796-1797) was proclaimed shah. His reign lasted until 1799, when it was absorbed by the Qajar rulers of Iran.

Administration 
Khalkhal khanate was ruled by nobles entitled khans, but after Qajar takeover their rulers title demoted to hakims. The khanate was divided into Khalkhal, Ţārom, Huna (modern Aqkand, Kaghazkonan District) and Hir mahals.

References 

History of Ardabil Province
Khalkhal County
States and territories established by the Afshar tribe